Vasile Olariu (born 6 July 1987) is a Romanian football player who plays as a midfielder.

Career
Born near Timișoara, Olariu began playing professional football for local side Unirea Sânnicolau Mare. In 2009, he was transferred to Victoria Brăneşti, where he led the club to promotion to Liga I, scoring 16 goals during the 2009–10 Liga II season. He scored eight of those goals from the penalty spot.

Olariu agreed to a one-year loan to Ukrainian Premier League side PFC Oleksandria in September 2011.

Olariu has played for Romania at the under-23 level, making his debut against Italy in March 2010.

Honours

Victoria Brănești
 Liga II winner (2009–10)

References

1987 births
Living people
People from Sânnicolau Mare
Romanian footballers
Association football midfielders
SCM Râmnicu Vâlcea players
CS Brănești players
FC Oleksandriya players
FC Brașov (1936) players
CSM Corona Brașov footballers
LPS HD Clinceni players
CS Afumați players
CS Unirea Sânnicolau Mare players
Liga I players
Liga II players
Romanian expatriate footballers
Expatriate footballers in Ukraine
Romanian expatriate sportspeople in Ukraine